Jean Gauvin (November 15, 1945 – June 6, 2007) was a Canadian politician. He served in the Legislative Assembly of New Brunswick from 1978 to 1987 and from 1991 to 1995, as a Progressive Conservative member for the constituency of Shippagan-les-Îles.

His son Robert Gauvin was elected to the Legislative Assembly of New Brunswick in 2018.

References

Progressive Conservative Party of New Brunswick MLAs
1945 births
2007 deaths